Traitsching is a municipality  in the district of Cham in Bavaria in Germany.

References

Cham (district)